Ewen Daniel Mackinnon  (11 February 1903 – 7 June 1983) was an Australian politician. The son of state MLA Donald Mackinnon, he was born in Melbourne and educated at Geelong Grammar School and then attended Oxford University. He returned to Australia as a grazier at Linton before becoming a company director and serving in the military 1938–43. In 1949, he was elected to the Australian House of Representatives as the Liberal for Wannon, but he was defeated in 1951. In 1953 he returned to the House as the member for Corangamite, having been elected in the by-election that followed the death of Allan McDonald. In 1966, Mackinnon retired from politics and was made a Commander of the Order of the British Empire (CBE).

In February 1967, Mackinnon was appointed Ambassador to Argentina; in 1968, while retaining the Argentinian position, he was also appointed Australia's first Ambassador to Peru and Uruguay. He held these positions until 1970.

Mackinnon died in 1983.

References

1903 births
1983 deaths
Liberal Party of Australia members of the Parliament of Australia
Members of the Australian House of Representatives for Wannon
Members of the Australian House of Representatives for Corangamite
Members of the Australian House of Representatives
Ambassadors of Australia to Peru
Ambassadors of Australia to Uruguay
Ambassadors of Australia to Argentina
20th-century Australian politicians
Australian Commanders of the Order of the British Empire
Volunteer Defence Corps officers
Alumni of New College, Oxford
People educated at Geelong Grammar School